RLH Equity Partners is a private equity firm based in Los Angeles that focuses on making investments in growing businesses. Sectors of particular investment interest to the firm include business services, healthcare, and government services.

History
The firm was co-founded in 1982 by Chris Lewis and Richard Riordan.  From inception through the late 1990s, RLH invested largely the capital of its principals.  Based upon the track record compiled during that period, the firm expanded its capital base, starting in 1999 by raising private equity funds predominantly from institutional investors. Over the ensuing two decades, the total committed capital of each of the firm's institutional funds, and the size of its professional staff, have grown steadily and in parallel.  The firm's first institutional fund, raised in 1999, was $120 million, while its second (raised in 2006) was $265 million, the third (raised in 2012) was $380 million, and the fourth and most recent fund (raised in 2017) comprised $510 million of capital commitments.

Investments
Some of RLH's notable current and past investments include:

Avella
BlueWolf Group
Clarity Insights
Cymetrix Corporation
Inspirage
maxIT Healthcare
Mondo
Secure Mission Solutions
Silverado Senior Living
The Chartis Group

References

External links
Riordan, Lewis & Haden (company website)

Financial services companies established in 1982
Private equity firms of the United States
Companies based in Los Angeles